The Telecom Regulatory Authority of India (TRAI) is a regulatory body set up by the Government of India under section 3 of the Telecom Regulatory Authority of India Act, 1997. It is the regulator of the telecommunications sector in India. It consists of a chairperson and not more than two full-time members and not more than two part-time members. The TRAI Act was amended by an ordinance, effective from 24 January 2000, establishing a Telecom Disputes Settlement and Appellate Tribunal to take over the adjudicatory and disputes functions from TRAI.

History
Telecom Regulatory Authority of India was established on 20 February 1997 by an Act of Parliament to regulate telecom services and tariffs in India. Earlier, regulation of telecom services and tariffs was overseen by the Central Government.

TRAI's mission is to create and nurture conditions for the growth of telecommunications in India to enable the country to have a leading role in the emerging global information society.

One of its main objectives is to provide a fair and transparent environment that promotes a level playing field and facilitates fair competition in the market. TRAI regularly issues orders and directions on various subjects such as tariffs, interconnections, quality of service, direct to home services and mobile number portability.

In January 2016, TRAI introduced an important change in telecommunication to the benefit of consumers, where they would be compensated  for every dropped call, subject to a maximum of three dropped calls in a day. In May 2016, this regulation was revoked by the Supreme Court on the grounds of being "unreasonable, arbitrary and unconstitutional".

Secretariat

TRAI is administered through a secretariat headed by a secretary. All proposals are processed by the secretary, who organises the agenda for authority meetings (consulting with the chairperson), prepares the minutes and issues regulations in accordance to the meetings. The secretary is assisted by advisors. These include Mobile Network, Interconnection and FixeNetwork, BroadBand and Policy Analysis, Quality of Service, Broadcasting & Cable Services, Economic Regulation, Financial Analysis & IFA, Legal, Consumer Affairs & International Relation and Administration & Personnel. Officers are selected from the Indian Telecommunications Service and the Indian Administrative Service (IAS). The current chairperson of TRAI is PD Vaghela, an IAS officer of the Gujarat cadre, batch of 1986.

TRAI Mobile Apps 
On 6 June 2017, TRAI launched three new apps and a web portal to highlight the telecom services that are being offered to the users.

Mycall app, MySpeed app and Do not disturb (DND 2.0) apps can be used to ensure that there is transparency between what consumers are paying for and what telecom operators are promising to provide at a certain rate.

In December 2018, TRAI released another app called TRAI Channel Selector. Using this app, they can add, remove and manage their channels.

Recent TRAI initiatives 
In order to increase broadband penetration in India, TRAI has proposed WANI (Wi-Fi Access Network Interface) architecture. If implemented, it may lead to set up of Public Data Offices (PDOs) where Wi-FI Internet would be available on demand. TRAI relates the same with PCOs which were used to do the voice calls and were very popular hotspots before the mobile phones or home landlines became the ultimate mode of communication.

TRAI reports 
To increase transparency and give a data-based overview of Indian Telecom Industry at regular intervals, TRAI publishes multiple reports under Release/Publication "Reports" section.

Controversies

Jio 
Allegedly, TRAI bent its rules multiple times to let Jio, a subsidiary of Reliance Industries Limited, become a market leader in the span of a few years. Jio was allowed to "test" its services for a much longer period and with a much larger subscriber base than was the industrial norm. In a letter to the telecom department, Rajan Mathews of the Cellular Operators Association of India wrote that Reliance's offers were "full-blown and full-fledged services masquerading as tests, which bypass regulations and can potentially game policy features." TRAI was also accused of modifying its definition of "significant market power" so as to exclude Jio from strict scrutiny. Whilst initially the definition of market power was based on total network activity, the parameters were changed to subscriber share and gross revenue. Jio qualified as a significant market power according to the first definition, but not the second.

See also
 Telecommunications in India
 The Telecom Commercial Communication Customer Preference Regulations, 2010

References

JEEin India: The rising importance of JEE in india

External links
 

Government agencies established in 1997
1997 establishments in India
Telecommunications authorities of India
Telecommunications regulatory authorities
Government agencies of India
Regulatory agencies of India